Last House Standing (Fang dong jiang xian sheng) is a documentary filmed in Shanghai featuring interviews of "Uncle Jiang" about his reluctance to sell his 1930s mansion in a district zoned for demolition.

Jiang talks about his family, his loneliness, the Cultural Revolution, and the relationship formed with his interviewer, reporter Zi "Miss Tomboy" Liang.

References

External links

2004 films
Chinese documentary films
2004 documentary films
Documentary films about urban studies
Films set in Shanghai